A diplococcus (plural diplococci) is a round bacterium (a coccus) that typically occurs in the form of two joined cells.

Types 
Examples of gram-negative diplococci are Neisseria spp. and Moraxella catarrhalis. Examples of gram-positive diplococci are Streptococcus pneumoniae and Enterococcus spp. 
Presumably, diplococcus has been implicated in encephalitis lethargica.

Taxonomy

Gram-negative diplococci

Neisseria spp. 
Phylum: Proteobacteria

Class: Betaproteobacteria

Order: Neisseriales

Family: Neisseriaceae

Genus: Neisseria

The genus Neisseria  belongs to the family Neisseriaceae. This genus, Neisseria, is divided into more than ten different species, but most of them are gram negative and coccoid. The gram-negative, coccoid species include: Neisseria cinerea, Neisseria gonorrhoeae, Neisseria polysaccharea, Neisseria lactamica, Neisseria meningitidis, Neisseria mucosa, Neisseria oralis and Neisseria subflava. Of these Neisseria species,  the most common, pathogenic species are N. meningitidis and N.gonorrhoeae.

Moraxella catarrhalis 

Phylum: Proteobacteria

Class: Gammaproteobacteria

Order: Pseudomonadales

Family: Moraxellaceae

Genus: Moraxella

The genus Moraxella belongs to the family Moraxellaceae. This genus, Moraxellaceae, comprises gram-negative coccobacilli bacteria: Moraxella lacunata, Moraxella atlantae, Moraxella boevrei, Moraxella bovis, Moraxella canis, Moraxella caprae, Moraxella caviae, Moraxella cuniculi, Moraxella equi, Moraxella lincolnii, Moraxella nonliquefaciens, Moraxella osloensis, Moraxella ovis and Moraxella saccharolytica, Moraxella pluranimalium. However, only one has a morphology of diplococcus, Moraxella catarrhalis. M. catarrhalis is a salient pathogen contributing to infections in the human body.

Gram-positive diplococci

Streptococcus pneumoniae 

Phylum: Firmicutes

Class: Bacilli

Order: Lactobacillales

Family: Streptococcaceae

Genus: Streptococcus

Species: Streptococcus pneumoniae

The species Streptococcus pneumoniae belongs to the genus Streptococcus and the family Streptococcaceae. The genus Streptococcus has around 129 species and 23 subspecies that benefit many microbiomes on the human body.  There are many species that show non-pathogenic characteristics; however, there are some, like S. pneumoniae, that exhibit pathogenic characteristics in the human body.

Enterococcus spp. 

Phylum: Firmicutes

Class: Bacilli

Order: Lactobacillales

Family: Enterococcaceae

Genus: Enterococcus

The genus Enterococcus belongs to the family Enterococcaceae. This genus is divided into 58 species and two subspecies. These gram-positive, coccoid bacteria were once thought to be harmless to the human body. However, within the last ten years, there has been an influx of nosocomial pathogens originating from Enterococcus bacteria.

Pathogenicity 
Many diplococci have species or strains that exhibit pathogenic characteristics. Examples of gram-negative pathogenic diplococci include N.gonorrhoeae and N. meningitidis. Examples of gram-positive pathogenic diplococci include Streptococcus pneumoniae and some species of Enterococcus bacteria.

References  

Bacteria

de:Diplokokken